Anchialos may refer to:

 Anchialos, town in Thrace now known as Pomorie, Bulgaria
 Nea Anchialos, Greek town in Thessaly
 Anchialos, Thessaloniki, village in Greece
 Anchialus, three characters in Greek mythology
 18263 Anchialos, asteroid